Rafael Valdomiro Greca de Macedo (born 17 March 1956) is a Brazilian engineer and politician, and the current mayor of Curitiba. He was minister of sport and tourism (1999–2000), state deputy (2003–06) and federal deputy from Paraná (2000–03). Greca was also mayor of Curitiba (from 1993 to 1996).

References 

1956 births
Living people
Members of the Legislative Assembly of Paraná
Ministers of Tourism of Brazil
Members of the Chamber of Deputies (Brazil) from Paraná
Democrats (Brazil) politicians
Brazilian Democratic Movement politicians
Democratic Labour Party (Brazil) politicians
Party of National Mobilization politicians
Liberal Front Party (Brazil) politicians
Democratic Social Party politicians
Mayors of Curitiba
Brazilian people of Italian descent
Brazilian people of Portuguese descent
Brazilian people of French descent
Sports ministers of Brazil